Petroglyph may refer to:

 Petroglyphs, Rock art depicting pictograms and logograms.
 Petroglyph Games, a real-time strategy games development studio.
 Petroglyphs Provincial Park, a provincial park near Peterborough, Ontario, Canada
 Petroglyph Provincial Park, a provincial park near Nanaimo, British Columbia, Canada
 Petroglyph (album)